Klutch Sports Group is an American sports agency based in Los Angeles, California, founded by sports agent Rich Paul.

History
In 2003, after the NBA draft, James asked Paul to be a part of his small inner circle, along with James' childhood friends Maverick Carter and Randy Mims. Paul quickly obliged. He would later start working under Leon Rose, who had negotiated James' extension with the Cavaliers in 2006, at Creative Artists Agency. In 2012, Paul left Rose and CAA to start his own agency, Klutch Sports Group, and took James with him. In 2013, Paul enlisted noted long-time agent and attorney Mark Termini to run the NBA contract negotiations for Klutch. By the conclusion of their agreement in 2020, Termini negotiated $1.4 billion in NBA contracts for Klutch Sports clients from 2014 through 2019.  Later that year, United Talent Agency (UTA) asked Paul to run its sports division through a partnership with Klutch where he expanded the sports clients from 4 to 23. In 2020, he accepted a position on UTA's board of directors. Paul also expanded its clientele at Klutch to include the National Football League (NFL) by hiring former player Damarius Bilbo.

In 2021, it hired sports agent Nicole Lynn as president of football operations.

Athletes

NBA 
Klutch Sports represents the following NBA athletes:

 OG Anunoby
 Lonzo Ball
 MarJon Beauchamp
 Eric Bledsoe
 Miles Bridges
 Troy Brown Jr.
 Kentavious Caldwell-Pope
 Jordan Clarkson
 Anthony Davis
 Anthony Edwards
 Darius Garland
 Aaron Gordon
 Draymond Green
 Jaden Hardy
 Montrezl Harrell
 Talen Horton-Tucker
 LeBron James
 Keldon Johnson
 Christian Koloko
 Zach LaVine
 Jalen Lecque
 Tyrese Maxey
 Ben McLemore
 Dejounte Murray
 Kendrick Nunn
 Jusuf Nurkić
 Scotty Pippen Jr.
 Terrence Ross
 Collin Sexton

 Juan Toscano-Anderson
 Gary Trent Jr.
 Lonnie Walker
 John Wall
 Trae Young
 De'Aaron Fox

NFL 
Klutch Sports has represented the following NFL athletes, either currently or formerly:

 Tremayne Anchrum
 Christian Barmore
 Mekhi Becton
 Camryn Bynum
 Rasul Douglas
 Dez Fitzpatrick
 Bryce Hall
 Kylin Hill
 Jalen Hurts
 Alex Leatherwood
 Kellen Mond
 Jeff Okudah
 Michael Pierce
 Bijan Robinson
 Quincy Roche
 Laviska Shenault
 DeVonta Smith
 Ke'Shawn Vaughn
 Quinnen Williams
 Jedrick Wills
 Donovan Peoples-Jones
 Marvin Wilson
 Chase Young

References

External links

LeBron James
American sports agents
Basketball